M1 Heavy Tractor was a term used by the United States Army during World War II for several different models of "off the shelf" civilian tracked tractors adopted for military use. Under the Ordnance Department, these tractors were meant to tow artillery pieces, and were not equipped with blades like their Corps of Engineers counterparts. Later in the war, these tractors were replaced in the prime mover role by heavy trucks such as the Mack NO or purpose-built "High Speed Tractors" such as the M4, M5, or M6. Some tractors were equipped with crane attachments for ammunition and material handling. 

More than 1,000 were leased to the Soviet Union. They mostly used them to tow 122 mm, 152 mm and even 203 mm guns. It saw good service as a prime mover for artillery.

Variants
Allis-Chalmers Model L
G-022 Caterpillar Model 60
G-89  Caterpillar RD7, 
G-98, G-107 Allis-Chalmers HD-10DW 
G-101 International Harvester TD-18 
G-126 Caterpillar D7
G-153 Caterpillar D8 
 
and perhaps others

Gallery

See also
List of U.S. military vehicles by model number
List of U.S. military vehicles by supply catalog designation
M1 medium tractor
M1 light tractor
M2 Light Tractor
Allis-Chalmers (See Military Machinery)

References
TM 9-1777A Heavy Tractor M1 International IHC TD-18
TM 9-1777C
TM 9-1773 Heavy Tractor M1, Caterpillar D7
TM 9-787A  Heavy Tractor M1, Allis-Chalmers HD-10W 
TM 9-1787A
TM 9-1787B

External links
Drawings jexiste.be
Use of M1 heavy tractor Caterpillar D7 through Lend Lease in the Soviet Union
Use of A-C HD-10W through Lend Lease in the Soviet Union
Use of IHC TD-18 through Lend Lease in the Soviet Union

Military vehicles of the United States